The 1906–07 Indiana State Sycamores men's basketball team represented Indiana State University during the 1906–07 collegiate men's basketball season. The head coach was John Kimmell, in his eighth season coaching the Sycamores. The team played their home games at North Hall in Terre Haute, Indiana.

Schedule

|-

References

Indiana State Sycamores men's basketball seasons
Indiana State
Indiana State
Indiana State